Luka Yoshida-Martin (born 10 April 2001) is an Australian rules footballer who plays for Brisbane in the AFL Women's (AFLW).

Early life

Soccer career
Yoshida-Martin started as a soccer player at the age of 8 and was identified at an early age selected as part of the National Premier Leagues Women's academy program. She played junior football with Brisbane City FC and The Gap FC. She was selected to represented Queensland in soccer.

She attended secondary school at Kedron State High School in Brisbane, Queensland.

At age of 19 was signed by Mitchelton FC to play senior football. A serious ankle injury almost put an end to her soccer career and she switched codes, playing both sports.

Switch to Australian rules
Yoshida-Martin began playing Australian rules in 2019 for the Kedron Football Club and was part of the Division 1 premiership team. She also played at University of Queensland in the AFL Queensland Women's League.

AFLW Career
She made her debut in the Lions' round 6 game against  at Trevor Barker Beach Oval on 13 February 2022.

References

External links
 

2001 births
Living people
Sportswomen from Queensland
Australian rules footballers from Queensland
Brisbane Lions (AFLW) players